Dicranucha dicksoni is a moth of the family Gelechiidae. It was described by Anthonie Johannes Theodorus Janse in 1963. It is found in South Africa (KwaZulu-Natal).

References

Endemic moths of South Africa
Moths described in 1963
Dicranucha